The National Democratic Party is a political party in Romania formed on 26 February 2015 by parliamentarians of the now defunct People's Party – Dan Diaconescu (PP-DD). The PP-DD later officially merged with the National Union for the Progress of Romania (UNPR) after its leader Diaconescu was arrested and sentenced for extortion.

The leader of the party's group in the Chamber of Deputies was lawyer Daniel Fenechiu. It previously had a cooperation agreement with the Romanian Social Party (PSRO) which was led by Mircea Geoană, ex-president of the Social Democratic Party. It subsequently merged with the National Liberal Party (PNL).

References

External links
  

2015 establishments in Romania
Conservative parties in Romania
Liberal parties in Romania
Political parties established in 2015